Club Deportivo Dandy was a Honduran football club that played in the Honduran Liga Nacional from 1982–83 to 1983–84, season in which they were relegated to the Second Division after finishing bottom with 27 points.

They played their home games at Estadio Francisco Morazán and were nicknamed los Catrines.

Achievements
Segunda División
Winners (1): 1981

League performance

References

Defunct football clubs in Honduras